Jil Jil is a locality in the local government area of the Shire of Buloke, Victoria, Australia. The post office opened as Reseigh on 25 November 1924 and was closed on 1 March 1929.

See also 
 List of reduplicated Australian place names

References